The Teatro Municipal of Caracas is an opera house in Venezuela. It was inaugurated by President Guzmán Blanco in 1881. The theatre was initially named after the president.

Construction

The building was designed by Esteban Ricard, a French architect who left Venezuela before the project was completed. It was finished under the direction of the Venezuelan engineer Jesús Muñoz Tébar. The building incorporates structural ironwork imported from Great Britain, as there was no domestic production at the time.

The building was modified in 1949 to facilitate redevelopment of central Caracas.

Repertoire
It is one of the oldest opera houses in South America; it opened on January 4, 1881, with Italian composer Errico Petrella's 1858 opera Jone, which was revived for the centennial of the theatre in 1981 with noted Argentine soprano Adelaida Negri in the title role. by  It continues to mount operatic productions. but it is no longer the city's main opera house since the Teresa Carreño Cultural Complex opened in the 1980s.

References

External links

Opera houses in Venezuela
Cast-iron architecture in Venezuela
Theatres completed in 1881
1881 establishments in Venezuela